The Shogun Warriors are fictional gigantic humanoid robotic constructs (mechas) appearing in American comic books published by Marvel Comics based on a line of toys of the same name.

Publication history
The Shogun Warriors were licensed by Marvel Comics to create a comic book series written by Doug Moench and drawn by Herb Trimpe.

Character biography
The Shogun Warriors series (composed of 20 issues) was published from February 1979 to September 1980. In the comic book series, the Shogun Warriors were created by a mysterious group called the Followers of the Light and human operators were chosen from all around the world to operate the massive robots in order to battle evil.

Marvel only licensed three Shogun Warriors characters for the comic book series:  
Raydeen, piloted by Richard Carson, an American stuntman.
Combatra, piloted by Genji Odashu, a Japanese test pilot.
Dangard Ace, piloted by Ilongo Savage, an oceanographer from Madagascar.

Between February 1979 and July 1979, Marvel had the comic book rights to both Godzilla and the Shogun Warriors. While the characters never crossed paths in their respective comics, Trimpe (who did the artwork for both series) drew a variation of Godzilla and Rodan alongside Daimos, Great Mazinger, Raydeen and Gaiking on the top page of a comic book advertisement soliciting the Shogun Warrior toys. Mattel simultaneously had a license to produce Shogun Warriors toys (at the time) and a license to produce toys based on Godzilla and Rodan. Though never appearing in the comic series, Red Ronin of Marvel's Godzilla, King of the Monsters comic book series was mentioned occasionally and was frequently written about in the letters pages. Shogun Warriors #15 (April 1980) was a fill-in written by Steven Grant with art by Mike Vosburg. The series took a dramatic turn with Shogun Warriors #16 (May 1980), as the Shogun Warriors' mentors were destroyed by the Primal One and his followers. This alien force decided that Earth's technology had outpaced its morality, making it their duty to destroy the Shogun Warriors as well as other powerful humans. Declining sales, as well as Moench's commitment to writing the Moon Knight comic book series that had just been started, led Marvel to cancel the Shogun Warriors comic book series. The three giant robots are destroyed (off-panel) to which the Fantastic Four and the robots' pilots (Richard, Genji and Ilongo) learn about the Samurai Destroyer (a giant robot built from an abandoned fourth robot that was never finished); this is because Marvel lost the rights to the characters.

Shogun Reapers
The Shogun Reapers are mechas within the Yakuza. When they built a cannon on the Moon to hold Earth hostage, Nick Fury Jr. broke into the Shogun Reapers' base in order to steal their powering device. The Shogun Reapers' leader Daniel "Danny Fear" Kiku and lieutenant Akihiko are outfitted in shogun mechas for a confrontation. However, Akihiko's suit gets hacked by the agent of S.H.I.E.L.D. to fight Danny Fear which decompressed the room and caused all the gangsters to be swallowed into space, killing Akihiko. However, the group's leader is revealed to be safely inside his mecha.

In other media
 A variation of Akihiko appears in the 2019 Marvel Studios film Avengers: Endgame, portrayed by Hiroyuki Sanada.

References

1979 comics debuts
Comics based on toys
Crossover comics
Marvel Comics titles
Mecha comics